The Irwin County School District is a public school district in Irwin County, Georgia, United States, based in Ocilla. It serves the entire population of Irwin County, including the communities of Irwinville and Ocilla. As of the 2014-2015 school year, Dr. Thad Clayton is superintendent and Dr. Emethel Mizell is assistant superintendent.

Schools
The Irwin County School District has one elementary school, one middle school, one alternative school, and one high school.

Elementary school
Irwin County Elementary School

Middle school
Irwin County Middle School

High school
Irwin County High School

References

External links

School districts in Georgia (U.S. state)
Education in Irwin County, Georgia